Abertam is a traditional Czech farmhouse hard cheese made from sheep milk. It has the shape of an irregular ball with thin yellow to orange natural rind. It is used as a table cheese or for melting.

Abertam is made in Karlovy Vary, a famous spa town. The natural pastures of this mountainous part of Bohemia provide the sheep with a rich diet that is revealed in the robust flavour of the hard pressed cheese. The cheese ripens in two months.

See also
 List of cheeses

References

Czech cheeses
Sheep's-milk cheeses